Simon Moss is a psychology academic, best known for developing Psychlopedia. Moss is a Senior lecturer in psychology at Monash University.

References

External links
Psychlopedia

Living people
Australian psychologists
Academic staff of Monash University
Date of birth missing (living people)
Place of birth missing (living people)
Year of birth missing (living people)